Edmund Waller (7 December 1838 – 6 February 1871) was an English first-class cricketer and British Army officer.

The son of the Church of England reverend Ernest Adolphus Waller, he was born in December 1838 at Bishop's Tachbrook, Warwickshire. He was educated at Marlborough College, where he captained the college cricket team. From Marlborough he enlisted in the British Army as an ensign in the 7th Royal Fusiliers, before purchasing the rank of lieutenant in July 1858. Waller made a single appearance in first-class cricket for the Gentlemen of Kent against the Gentlemen of Marylebone Cricket Club at Canterbury in 1865. Batting twice in the match, he was dismissed in the Gentlemen of Kent first innings for 16 runs by Henry Arkwright, while in their second innings he was dismissed for 6 runs by the same bowler. In May 1866, he was promoted to captain. Waller died at Eaton Square in Pimlico on 6 February 1871.

References

External links

1838 births
1871 deaths
People from Warwick District
People educated at Marlborough College
Royal Fusiliers officers
English cricketers
Gentlemen of Kent cricketers